Midlands 3 East (South) is a level 8 English Rugby Union league and level 3 of the Midlands League, made up of teams from the southern part of the East Midlands region including clubs from Bedfordshire, Leicestershire, Northamptonshire and occasionally Cambridgeshire and Oxfordshire, all of whom play home and away matches throughout the season.  When this division began in 1992 it was known as Midlands East 2, until it was split into two regional divisions called Midlands 4 East (North) and Midlands 4 East (South) ahead of the 2000–01 season.  Further restructuring of the Midlands leagues ahead of the 2009–10 season, led to the current name of Midlands 3 East (South).  

Promoted teams tend to move up to Midlands 2 East (South) while demoted teams typically drop to Midlands 4 East (South).  Each year all clubs in the division also take part in the RFU Senior Vase - a level 8 national competition.

2021–22

Participating teams & locations

2020–21
Due to the COVID-19 pandemic, the 2020–21 season was cancelled.

2019–20

Participating teams & locations

2018–19

Participating teams & locations

2017–18

Participating teams & locations

Teams 2016-17
Aylestone St James (transferred from Midlands 3 East (North))
Biggleswade (relegated from Midlands 2 East (South))
Daventry
Dunstablians
Leicester Forest (relegated from Midlands 2 East (South))
Long Buckby
Northampton BBOB
Northampton Casuals
Northampton Men's Own (promoted from Midlands 4 East (South))
St Ives (Midlands)
St Neots
Stewarts & Lloyds

Teams 2015-16
Daventry
Dunstablians (relegated from Midlands 2 East (South))
Long Buckby
Northampton BBOB
Northampton Casuals
Old Newtonians (promoted from Midlands 4 East (South))
Oundle
Rugby St Andrews
Stockwood Park
St Ives (Midlands)
St Neots (promoted from Midlands 4 East (South)) 
Stewarts & Lloyds (relegated from Midlands 2 East (South))

Teams 2014-15
Bedford Queens	
Daventry
Long Buckby (promoted from Midlands 4 East (South))
Northampton BBOB (relegated from Midlands 2 East (South))
Northampton Casuals
Northampton Mens Own
Oundle	(promoted from Midlands 4 East (South))
Rugby St Andrews	
Rushden & Higham (relegated from Midlands 2 East (South))
St Ives (Midlands)	
Stockwood Park	
Vipers

Teams 2013-14
Bedford Queens	
Biggleswade (relegated from Midlands 2 East (South))
Brackley (promoted from Midlands 4 East (South))
Daventry
Deepings
Northampton Casuals
Northampton Mens Own
Rugby St Andrews
St Ives (Midlands) (promoted from Midlands 4 East (South))
Stewarts & Lloyds
Stockwood Park
Vipers (relegated from Midlands 2 East (South))

Teams 2012–13
Bedford Queens	
Daventry
Deepings
Long Buckby
Northampton Casuals
Northampton Mens Own
Old Newtonians
Rugby St Andrews
Rushden & Higham
Stamford
Stewarts & Lloyds
Stockwood Park

Teams 2011–12
Bedford Queens	
Bedford Swifts
Biggleswade
Brackley
Daventry
Deepings
Northampton BBOB
Northampton Casuals
Rugby St Andrews
Rushden & Higham
Stamford
Stewarts & Lloyds

Teams 2010–11
Bedford Queens	
Bedford Swifts
Brackley
Daventry
Deepings
Long Buckby
Northampton Casuals
Northampton Mens Own
Oadby Wyggestonians
Old Newtonians
Rugby St Andrews
Rushden & Higham

Teams 2008–09
Aylestone St James
Banbury
Huntingdon & District
Leicester Forest 
Lutterworth 
Northampton BBOB
Northampton Old Scouts
Old Newtonians
Old Northamptonians
Stewarts & Lloyds
Towcestrians
Vipers

Original teams

Teams in Midlands 3 East (North) and Midlands 3 East (South) were originally part of a single division called Midlands 2 East, which contained the following sides when in was introduced in 1992:

Coalville - promoted from East Midlands/Leicestershire (6th)
Glossop - promoted from Notts, Lincs & Derbyshire 1 (6th)
Kesteven - promoted from Notts, Lincs & Derbyshire 1 (9th)
Kettering - promoted from East Midlands/Leicestershire (7th)
Lincoln - promoted from Notts, Lincs & Derbyshire 1 (10th)
Long Buckby - promoted from East Midlands 1 (champions)
Lutterworth - promoted from East Midlands/Leicestershire (10th)
Market Rasen & Louth - promoted from Notts, Lincs & Derbyshire 2 (runners up)
Northampton BBOB - promoted from East Midlands/Leicestershire (9th)
South Leicester - promoted from Leicestershire 1 (champions)
Southwell - promoted from Notts, Lincs & Derbyshire 1 (7th)
Stamford - promoted from Notts, Lincs & Derbyshire 1 (8th)
Wellingborough - promoted from East Midlands/Leicestershire (8th)
Worksop - promoted from Notts, Lincs & Derbyshire 2 (champions)

Midlands 3 East (South) honours

Midlands East 2 (1992–1993)

Midlands 3 East (North) and Midlands 3 East (South) were originally part of a single tier 8 division called Midlands East 2.  Promotion was to Midlands East 1 and relegation was to either East Midlands/Leicestershire 1 or Notts, Lincs & Derbyshire 1.

Midlands East 2 (1993–1996)

The top six teams from Midlands 1 and the top six from North 1 were combined to create National 5 North, meaning that Midlands 2 East dropped to become a tier 9 league.  Promotion continued to Midlands East 1 while relegation was to either East Midlands/Leicestershire 1 or Notts, Lincs & Derbyshire 1.

Midlands East 2 (1996–2000)

At the end of the 1995–96 season National 5 North was discontinued and Midlands East 2 returned to being a tier 8 league.  Promotion continued to Midlands East 1 while relegation was to either East Midlands/Leicestershire 1 or Notts, Lincs & Derbyshire 1.

Midlands 4 East (South) (2000–2006)

Restructuring ahead of the 2000–01 season saw Midlands East 2 split into two tier 8 regional leagues - Midlands 4 East (North) and Midlands 4 East (South).  Promotion was now to Midlands 3 East (North) and relegation to East Midlands 1.

Midlands 4 East (South) (2006–2009)

Midlands 4 East (South) continued to be a tier 8 league with promotion up into Midlands 3 East (South).  However, the cancellation of East Midlands 1 at the end of the 2005–06 season meant that relegation was now to the newly introduced Midlands 5 East (South).

Midlands 3 East (South) (2009–present)

League restructuring by the RFU meant that Midlands 4 East (North) and Midlands 4 East (South) were renamed as Midlands 3 East (North) and Midlands 3 East (South), with both leagues remaining at tier 8.  Promotion was now to Midlands 2 East (South) (formerly Midlands 3 East (South)) and relegation to Midlands 4 East (South) (formerly Midlands 5 East (South)).

Number of league titles

Leicester Forest (2)
Lutterworth (2)
Market Harborough (2)
Rushden & Higham (2)
Stamford (2)
Aylestone St James (1)
Biggleswade (1)
Bugbrooke (1)
Coalville (1)
Dunstablians (1)
Ilkeston (1)
Kettering (1)
Long Buckby (1)
Luton (1)
Market Bosworth (1)
Northampton BBOB (1)
Northampton Men's Own (1)
Oadby Wyggestonians (1)
Oundle (1)
St Ives (Midlands) (1)
Stewarts & Lloyds (1)
Vauxhall Motors (1)
Vipers (1)

Notes

See also
Midlands RFU
East Midlands RFU
Leicestershire RU
English rugby union system
Rugby union in England

References

Rugby First: To view previous seasons in the league, search for any club within that league then click on to club details followed by fixtures and then select the appropriate season.

8
4
Rugby union in Bedfordshire
Rugby union in Northamptonshire
Rugby union in Leicestershire